Ontario station may refer to:

Ontario station (Amtrak), an Amtrak station in Ontario, California
Ontario–East station, a Metrolink station in Ontario, California
Ontario station (Oregon), a historic station in Ontario, Oregon
Rail stations in Ontario, Canada